Conarete is a genus of midges in the family Cecidomyiidae. There are 13 described species in this genus. It was established by Arthur Earl Pritchard in 1951.

Species
Conarete brevipalpa Li & Bu, 2002
Conarete calcuttaensis (Nayar, 1949)
Conarete crebra Pritchard, 1951
Conarete deepica Deshpande, 1983
Conarete eluta Pritchard, 1951
Conarete eschata Pritchard, 1951
Conarete indica (Mani, 1934)
Conarete indorensis Grover, 1970
Conarete mihijamensis Grover, 1964
Conarete orientalis Rao, 1956
Conarete sicyoidea Li & Bu, 2002
Conarete texana (Felt, 1913)
Conarete triangularis Shaikh, Siddiqui, Najam, Sanap & Deshpande, 2011

References

Cecidomyiidae genera
Insects described in 1951
Taxa named by Arthur Earl Pritchard